The Popular Association "Odrodzenie" was a centre-left political party in the Republic of Central Lithuania. Following the 1922 general elections, it held 3 seats in the Sejm of Central Lithuania. Its political programme was based on agrarianism and agrarian socialism, and was similar to the one of  Polish People's Party "Wyzwolenie" that operated in Poland. It supported the federation of Central Lithuania with Lithuania. Its leader was Stefan Mickiewicz.

Citations

Notes

References 

Political parties in the Republic of Central Lithuania
Political parties disestablished in 1922
Centre-left parties in Europe
Defunct agrarian political parties
Defunct socialist parties in Europe